The Classic Flyers Museum is an aviation museum located at the Tauranga Airport, Mount Maunganui, New Zealand, owned by a registered New Zealand charitable trust, the Bay of Plenty Classic Aircraft Trust.

The museum has a range of flying and static aircraft displays as well as a cafe.

History

The museum was started in 2000 when several local businessmen, who were also aviation enthusiasts, decided to see if an existing World War II-era hangar at the Tauranga Airfield could be renovated for use. The hangar proved to be unsalvageable but the group decided to build a new facility instead and formed the Bay of Plenty Classic Aircraft Trust. The new hangar is at the entrance to the Tauranga Airport, on Jean Batten Drive, Mount Maunganui.

The founders decided to focus on creating a flying museum, as opposed to one that just had static displays, with the intention of having a high number of museum aircraft movements.

The museum was officially opened on Saturday 28 May 2005 with an air display and fly-past.

In October 2012, the museum launched the Legacy Jet Centre and celebrated the arrival of an Aermacchi aircraft to be restored.  In recognition of funding from the Legacy Trust, the main hangar was named "The Legacy Jet Centre".

Currently, the museum is spread across three adjacent hangars, the first of which houses the visitor centre, cafe, and most of the museum exhibits, while the other two accommodate the bulk of the classic aircraft in working flying condition.

Additional airplanes are on display outside the hangars.  One of them is an old New Zealand National Airways Corporation DH-Heron, which is open to the public, but not in airworthy condition.

Aims
The museum aims are:
 Preserve classic and historic aircraft
 Support the retention of New Zealand’s aviation history

The Trust focuses on preserving aircraft and memorabilia that has a connection to the Bay of Plenty area or New Zealand generally.

Collection
The museum aircraft collection includes:

Aermacchi MB-339
Boeing Stearman
Cessna 188 AGwagon
Consolidated PBY-5A Catalina (fuselage)
Curtiss P-40E Kittyhawk
de Havilland DH 104 Devon C.1
de Havilland DH 114 Heron
de Havilland Vampire
de Havilland DH 112 Venom
Douglas A-4K Skyhawk
EEL ULF 1 ultralight glider
Fletcher FU24
Grumman TBF-1C Avenger
Hall Cherokee II glider
Hawker Hunter T75
Hughes 300
North American Harvard
North American F-86 Sabre
Pacific Aerospace Corporation CT-4B Airtrainer
Pitts Special S-1C
Schleicher Ka-6CR glider
Slingsby T-45 Swallow glider
Supermarine Spitfire Mk V - replica
Victa Airtourer T-3A
Yakovlev Yak 52

Moreland Collection
The museum also has exhibits on loan from Andy Moreland's Tauwhare Military Museum in a "M*A*S*H Chopper Hangar" that is located behind the main museum building. This collection includes Unimog vehicles, Jeeps, uniforms and weapons.

References

External links 

 The Classic Flyers Museum
 The Tauranga City Airshow

Aerospace museums in New Zealand
Buildings and structures in Tauranga
Military and war museums in New Zealand
Museums in the Bay of Plenty Region